The 2015–16 snooker season was a series of snooker tournaments played between 7 May 2015 and 2 May 2016.

The World Grand Prix became a ranking event featuring the top 32 players on a one-year money list, having been a non-ranking event the previous season.

New professional players

Countries:
 
 
 
 
 
 
 
 
 
 
 

The top 64 players from the prize money rankings after the 2015 World Championship, and the 30 players earning a two-year card the previous year automatically qualified for the season. The top eight players from the European Tour Order of Merit and top four players from the Asian Tour Order of Merit, who had not already qualified for the Main Tour, also qualified. Another two players came from the EBSA Qualifying Tour Play-Offs, and a further eight places were available through the Q School. The rest of the places on to the tour came from amateur events and national governing body nominations. Hossein Vafaei's two-year tour card will commence this season. All players listed below received a tour card for two seasons. 

IBSF World Snooker Championship winner:  Yan Bingtao
IBSF World Under-21 Snooker Championship winner:  Hossein Vafaei
EBSA European Snooker Championships winner:  Michael Wild
EBSA European Under-21 Snooker Championships winner:  Darryl Hill
ACBS Asian Snooker Championship winner:  Hamza Akbar
ACBS Asian Under-21 Snooker Championship winner:  Sunny Akani
Pan-American Championship winner:  Itaro Santos
ABSF African Championships winner:  Hatem Yassen
Oceania Championship winner:  Vinnie Calabrese

European Tour Order of MeritEBSA Qualifying Tour Play-Offs

Asian Tour Order of Merit

Q School
Event 1

Event 2

International Development Main Tour Card

Calendar 
The following tables outline the dates and results of all World Snooker Tour, World Ladies Billiards and Snooker, seniors, and other events.

World Snooker Tour

World Ladies Billiards and Snooker

Seniors events

Other events

Points distribution 
2015/2016 points distribution for World Snooker Tour ranking and minor-ranking events:

Notes

References

External links
Snooker season 2015/2016 at Snooker.org

2015
Season 2016
Season 2015